The 1970–71 Alpha Ethniki was the 35th season of the highest football league of Greece. The season began on 20 September 1970 and ended on 13 June 1971. AEK Athens won their fifth Greek title and their first one in three years.

The point system was: Win: 3 points - Draw: 2 points - Loss: 1 point.

League table

Results

Top scorers

External links
Results at RSSSF
Table at the official Greek FA Site

Alpha Ethniki seasons
Greece
1970–71 in Greek football leagues